Triangle Marsh is a wetland of the San Francisco Bay, situated at the base of Ring Mountain at the north end of the Tiburon Peninsula in Marin County, California.

Archaeological Pecked curvilinear nucleated petroglyphs, and recovery on Ring Mountain, hold significant evidence of Native American habitation and likely proof that early Miwok peoples exploited marine resources from Triangle Marsh.

The  property is owned by the Marin branch of the National Audubon Society who restored upland and wetland habitats there with funding from a variety of sources. Federal endangered species, including the clapper rail and salt marsh harvest mouse, live in the Marsh.

See also
 Strawberry Spit
 Class of 1918 Marsh

References

External links
 Chuck Morton and Michael Galloway (2006) Tidal marsh restoration at Triangle marsh, Marin County, John Muir Research Institute
 C. Michael Hogan (2008) Ring Mountain, The Megalithic Portal, ed. A. Burnham
 Marin Audubon Society Restoration Page

Marshes of California
Landforms of Marin County, California
Wetlands of the San Francisco Bay Area
Miwok
Archaeological sites in California
Natural history of Marin County, California
Nature reserves in California
Protected areas of Marin County, California
Tiburon, California